Fordingbridge was a railway station serving Fordingbridge, a small town in Hampshire. It was one of many casualties of the mass closure of British railway lines in the 1960s and 1970s. The line was officially closed on 4 May 1964, but as there was no Sunday service the last trains ran on the 2nd. It was served by the Salisbury and Dorset Junction Railway, a line running north–south, along the River Avon just to the west of the New Forest, connecting Salisbury to the North and Poole to the south, meeting the Southampton and Dorchester Railway at West Moors.

Today, the road leading out of Fordingbridge to Sandleheath village is still called Station Road; however, the spot where the station once stood is now occupied by a large mill and industrial park. Ashford Road is where the railway cottages are, the road joins onto Station Road.

External links
Fordingbridge Station on Subterranea Britannica

Further reading

  

Disused railway stations in Hampshire
Former London and South Western Railway stations
Railway stations in Great Britain opened in 1866
Railway stations in Great Britain closed in 1964
Beeching closures in England
1866 establishments in England
Fordingbridge